Sewells Road Bridge is a single direction suspension bridge that carries vehicular traffic north and south on Sewells Road over the Rouge river in Toronto. The bridge is unique as it is one of only a few suspension bridges found in Ontario, and one of the shortest vehicular applications (most suspension bridges are used to span major waterways or valleys).

History
Completed in 1912, it was designed by civil engineer Frank Barber and Lewis Construction.  It is the only suspension bridge in Toronto. The bridge likely provided the only means to cross the Rouge in north Scarborough when it was built. It is located not far from another important bridge crossing the Rouge, Old Finch Avenue Bailey Bridge.

Current
The bridge remains in use (with restoration in 1981) and is listed in the city's list of historic structures (one of 15 bridges). Two single cables holds up the  bridge with loads under  and is maintained by Toronto Transportation Services.

An historic plaque was added after 1981 to provide details on the bridge's history and unique value.

See also
 Leaside Bridge - also designed by Barber
 Old (16th Avenue) Bailey Bridge

Sewells Road is one of only a few suspension bridges in Ontario:
 Ambassador Bridge
 Ogdensburg–Prescott International Bridge
 Thousand Islands Bridge

References

Bridges in Toronto
Bridges completed in 1912
Road bridges in Ontario
Suspension bridges in Canada
1912 establishments in Ontario